Elizabeth Hanniford (January 1, 1909 – December 1977) was an American politician from New York.

Life
Elizabeth Hanniford was born on January 1, 1909, in New York City. She attended public schools, and then became a statistician.  She married Kenneth Hanniford (1901–1964), and they had a son: Kenneth Hanniford (born c. 1935).

Hanniford was a Republican member of the New York State Assembly (Bronx Co., 9th D.) from 1947 to 1950, sitting in the 166th and 167th New York State Legislatures.

She died in December 1977.

Sources

External links
 A photo of her in The Herald Statesman, of Yonkers, on May 5, 1947

1909 births
1977 deaths
Republican Party members of the New York State Assembly
Women state legislators in New York (state)
20th-century American politicians
20th-century American women politicians
Politicians from the Bronx